The Comeng train is a type of electric multiple unit (EMU) that operates on the suburban railway network of Melbourne, Victoria, Australia. Built by Commonwealth Engineering (Comeng) in Dandenong, they were introduced in 1981 as a replacement for the Tait and Harris trains. In total, 570 carriages (380 motor cars and 190 trailer cars, a total of 95 six carriage sets) were built.

Description 
Comeng trains are single deck and are semi-permanently coupled as M-T-M (motor-trailer-motor) sets. Most frequently, they are coupled as M-T-M-M-T-M (six-car) sets. Comeng trains have power operated doors that must be pulled open by hand but are closed by the driver. The trains were the first suburban trains in Melbourne to have air-conditioning in the passenger saloon. (The older Hitachi trains had driver only air-conditioning fitted more recently.)

They operate in larger numbers on the Northern, Caulfield, Cross City and Sandringham group lines. Since 2017, it has been rare to see Comeng’s on the Burnley and Clifton Hill group lines which are serviced almost exclusively by newer X'Trapolis trains. The design of Melbourne's Comeng trains is closely related to that of TransAdelaide's diesel-electric 3000 class railcars.

The Comeng fleet has begun retirement, with many sets being transferred to North Shore and Tottenham to be stored. The stored sets eventually being transferred to Laverton, North Bendigo or McIntyre for scrapping. The fleet will eventually be replaced by the High Capacity Metro Trains (HCMT) and X'Trapolis 2.0 fleet.

History 

In 1979, the operator of the Melbourne rail network at the time VicRail, placed an initial order for 100 new 3-car train sets, with the intention of replacing the last of the Tait sets and the majority of the Harris sets. The contract was awarded to Commonwealth Engineering, with the trains being manufactured at Comeng's factory based in Dandenong.

The first Comeng set, 301M-1001T-302M, entered service on 28 September 1981. By the middle of 1984, 76 sets had been delivered, and some of the older trains, including the last of the Tait rolling stock, had begun to be phased out. Following the operational problems and subsequent failed refurbishment of the Harris fleet, the initial order was increased from 100 to 190 3-car sets, with the aim of completely replacing both the Tait and Harris sets by 1988.

Set 381M-1041T-382M was the first delivered in the Metropolitan Transit green and yellow scheme, though the sets including 27T and 28T had been repainted (with those cars renumbered 1027T and 1028T respectively) before then. Notably, when the 41st set was delivered the front panels of the motor carriages were still silver-framed rather than yellow.

The 45th set delivered had custom decals applied to the sides celebrating the halfway point through the order. On the side (above each door) was the quote "45th Super Train from The Met", and the sides also displayed the number 45 in large Numerals below the windows. This was found on two sets, 477M-1089T-478M and 479M-1090T-480M. These had been removed by 1 February 1991. 477M-1089T-478M still remains in service, but 479M-1090T-480M was stored at North Shore before being scrapped in early 2022. 

The final Comeng set to enter service was 697M-1199T-698M on 24 July 1989.

Refurbishment 
2000 - 2003

Between 2000 and 2003, the two train operators at the time, Connex and M>Train, had Alstom and EDi Rail respectively refurbish the trains.

The Alstom and EDi Rail sets have a number of differences, including:

 Interior arrangement - The interior LED displays on the M>Train trains were in the middle, as opposed to being at both ends of the carriage on Connex sets.
 Upholstery - Seats in M>Train trains were given a blue texture, while Connex opted for rainbow-textured seats.
 Seating arrangement - Both operators designed their carriages different seating layouts.
 Exterior front panels - Information on the train's terminus is displayed on top of the window on M>Train fleets, while Connex trains have them displaying on the left window (in pre-refurbishment style).
 Cab layout - The EDI Rail refurbished trains retained a second full-size seat on the right-hand side of the cab, originally used for the guard, whereas the Alstom sets only have a small seat, the same size as the passenger ones.
 Cab fittings - The EDi Rail trains also have a windscreen-wiper on both sides, the Alstom sets only having one on the driver's side.
 Light fittings - The Alstom refurbished trains have grated light coverings, while the EDi type retained the original flat coverings.

Both sets had CCTV and emergency assistance panels introduced and installed as part of the refurbishment program.

After Connex assumed responsibility for all of Melbourne's suburban train network in 2004, the EDi refurbished trains had the M>Train exterior logos removed, and later received Connex blue and yellow side stripes, and a repainted front panel.

Concorde program 
2006 - 2007
From December 2006 both fleets were allowed to run system wide. The electronics of both Comeng types were altered to make them electronically compatible with each other, with both the PID voices and display formatting altered. Both types of Comeng can run system wide and can run in multiple unit with trains of the same or different type.

Interior rearrangements 
2009
From the beginning of March 2009, Connex ran a test set of carriages with new seating arrangement on city lines. The new arrangements removed 44 seats, making room for more standing on the train. The changes were made to accommodate the increased patronage on the Melbourne rail network.

Door upgrades 
2014 - 2015
Comeng trains still require passengers to manually open saloon doors to enter and exit the trains. Pneumatic air pressure keeps the doors closed whilst the trains are in motion, and is released by the driver when the carriages stop at station platforms. Prior to 2014, the doors were fitted with large "door knob" style handles. These made it relatively easy for unruly passengers to force the doors open, including while the train was in motion. All carriages were retrofitted with a new flat slim handle designed to make doors more difficult to force open. This followed an incident at Watergardens railway station where teenagers forced a door open while the train was moving and one jumped out, causing injury to himself. Alan Osbourne, then director of Transport Safety Victoria (TSV), informed Metro that the Comeng trains would be taken out of service if their doors were not made impossible to force open by 2017.

Life extension 
2017 - 2021

From 2017 to 2021, the entirety of the existing Comeng fleet undertook a $75 million life extension refurbishment program with a number of upgrades taking place in order to allow the fleet to operate reliably and safely for at least another decade prior to their retirement. These upgrades were carried out in stages (1, 2 & 3), focusing on external, internal, mechanical and safety system upgrades.

Stage 1 of the life extension refurbishment works revolved only on exterior modifications, with much of the mechanical and safety systems remaining the same and their interiors largely unaltered from their 2014/2015 modifications. 25% of the existing Comeng fleet undertook only the stage 1 life extension refurbishment. The stage 1 upgrades include:

 LED marker lights
 New vinyl stickering with PTV branding identity livery on the exterior fibreglass front panels.
 Removal of external handles and step ladders at the leading end of all motor cars to reduce instances of train surfing.

Stage 2 of the life extension refurbishment works concentrated on both interior and mechanical upgrades, with 75% of the existing Comeng fleet undertaking the stage 2 refurbishment. In addition to the stage 1 upgrades, the stage 2 upgrades include:

 Updated upholstery - Seats in Connex rainbow-textured pattern were updated to Public Transport Victoria's corporate identity in either blue or orange (priority seating) geometric design.
 Additional and upgraded grab handles and poles.
 Concertina style enclosed gangways between carriages.
 Improved saloon lighting and additional handholds.
 Door upgrades.
 Improvements to the driver's panel.

Stage 3 of the life extension refurbishment works focused on communications and additional mechanical upgrades, with 31% of the Comeng fleet, namely the disc brake units, having been further enhanced with these upgrades. These sets will more than likely be the last Comeng sets to remain in service when they will be eventually retired. In addition to the stage 2 upgrades, the stage 3 upgrades include:

 New external LED destination signs.
 New dynamic Passenger Information Screens which displays real time data.
 Improved safety enhancements, including an upgrade to high definition CCTV cameras with better clarity and a wider field of view, and new emergency help points.
 Improvements to hearing aid links with a new and upgraded speaker and onboard announcement system.
 Improvements to the overall air compression system powering the brakes, doors, pantographs and traction systems.

The life extension refurbishment program was completed by the end of 2021 with 75% of the Comeng units having undergone the stages 2/3 upgrades. As of June 2022, all stage 1 sets, along with some stage 2 sets have been withdrawn from service, having since been replaced by the High Capacity Metro Trains.

Retirement 

In November 2017, none of the remaining Comeng chopper carriages including the (691M-698M) motors and (1196T-1199T) trailers were included in the new Metro contract, which saw them retired out of service. Half of these units were stored at Newport Workshops, while the other half have been supplying parts to the remaining Comeng units in service.

In 2018, Comeng set 313M-1007T-314M and 367M-1034T-368M were withdrawn from service and stored at Newport Workshops. 

In 2019, it was revealed that if the X'Trapolis 2.0 was made, the Comengs could be out of service as early as 2026

On 21 August 2021, retired Comeng sets 321M-1107T-320M and 363M-1032T-364M were transferred to North Shore. These sets were replaced with the High Capacity Metro Trains, starting a long process of the retirement of Comeng sets, likely to take most of the decade. As of 27 April 2022, 44 3-car Comeng sets have been retired out of 189 3-car sets in service at the formation of Metro Trains Melbourne. 

On 9 February 2022, the first Comeng unit was scrapped since 2014. This saw the scrapping of set 338M-1092T-484M at Dandenong South. Subsequently, there have been 22 3-car Comeng sets scrapped as of 7 September 2022.

On 12 June 2022, the last of the Stage 1 Comengs (331M-1050T-400M & 393M-1048T-394M) were transferred to Newport Workshops to be decommissioned.

All remaining Comeng sets of the earlier 'tread brake' variety are now EDI refurbishments, as of September 2022 all Alstom refurbished sets in this group had been withdrawn. As of the same date one chopper set, 693M-1197T-694M has been scrapped.

Stored carriages 
 70 Comeng carriages have been scrapped or removed from service.

Eight carriages have been scrapped prior to the major withdrawals (from 2021 onwards): 315M, 388M, 1165T, 1109T, 533M, 305M, 1003T and 306M. 315M was burnt out at Hurstbridge on 9 April 1983, along with Tait 472M, 388M was hit by V/Line locomotive N457 at Officer, 1165T was burnt out at Northcote, 1109T was damaged in a collision with Comeng 634M at Epping, while 533M was burnt out by vandals at Merlynston in April 2002. Both 1109T and 533M were stored at the Ballarat Workshops and were scrapped in August 2010. In November 2012, 305M-1003T-306M crashed into a truck at Abbotts Road in Dandenong South. These cars were stored in Dandenong South near the crash site, visible from the Cranbourne Line until May 2014, when they were scrapped.

Following the Dandenong South collision, set 583M-1022T-589M was withdrawn and stored at Newport Workshops. This set was trailing 305M-1003T-306M but received significantly less damage.

Another four carriages have been stored: 500M, 671M, 672M, and 1186T. 500M was burnt out at Sandringham in 2002 and can be seen in a yard close to the North Williamstown station side of the Newport railway workshops. 671M was partly burnt out at Gowrie in 1994. Spare cars 672M and 1186T, which were made redundant after 671M was burnt, underwent a prototype refurbishment before being stored. 671M is currently in use by Fire Rescue Victoria for firefighter training.

On 25 February 2019, EDI Comeng 333M collided with a buffer stop at the end of a stabling siding at Newport. The train was withdrawn from service and EDI Comeng 314M was modified to run with 1017T and 334M. The set was coupled with existing retired cars 313M and 1007T, and was stripped of useable parts in preparation for scrapping.

In popular culture 
 An Alstom refurbished Comeng in Connex colors can be seen in the background of a carriage scene on the TV series How I Met Your Mother, Season 9, Episode 1 (set in New York).
 2 withdrawn Alstom refurbished Comengs can be seen in the background of the Australian TV series, Superwog, Season 1, Episode 6, The Zombie Apocalypse. Which was filmed at Newport Workshops.

References

External links 

 Comeng M carriages at Peter J Vincent
 Comeng T carriages at Peter J Vincent

Melbourne rail rollingstock
Electric multiple units of Victoria (Australia)
1500 V DC multiple units of Victoria
Train-related introductions in 1981